Vila do Bispo is a former civil parish in the municipality of Vila do Bispo, in the southern Algarve, Portugal. In 2013, the parish merged into the new parish Vila do Bispo e Raposeira.

Geography
The parish is divided into three areas: the north, composed of schist and carbon greywacke (dating to 360 Ma), the south, characterised by limestone deposits from the Jurassic period (200 Ma), and a narrow area that separates the two composed of reddish sandstones from the Triassic (230 Ma.), known as the Grés de Silves.

The coastal region is a window on the region's history, with many of the schists and greywacke sediments intensely folded and faulted by tectonic pressures. Above these carbon cliffs, which comprise the ancient massif, is a plateau of sandstones from the Pliocene (5 Ma.), and in Castelejo and Cordoama, consolidated dunes from the Pleistocene (1.8 Ma). In the Triassic and Jurassic formations there are eruptions of faults from volcanic eruptions during the formative processes.

The Mediterranean climate is heavily influenced by the Atlantic Ocean. Fog is persist and frequent, concentrating in many specific locations.

References

Former parishes of Vila do Bispo